Clifford Tyrone Charlton (born February 16, 1965) is an American former college and professional football player who was a linebacker in the National Football League (NFL) for two seasons during the late 1980s.  Charlton played college football for the University of Florida, and received All-American honors.  A first-round pick in the 1988 NFL Draft, he played professionally for the NFL's Cleveland Browns.

Early years 

Charlton was born in Tallahassee, Florida in 1965.  He attended Leon High School in Tallahassee, where he was a standout high school football player for the Leon Lions.

College career 

Charlton accepted an athletic scholarship to attend the University of Florida in Gainesville, Florida, and played linebacker for coach Galen Hall's Florida Gators football team from 1984 to 1987.  He was a member of the Gators' best-in-the-Southeastern Conference (SEC) football teams that posted identical 9–1–1 overall win–loss records in 1984 and 1985.  He was also a first-team All-SEC selection in 1986 and 1987, and a first-team All-American and team captain in 1987.  Charlton's fifteen forced fumbles, forty-nine career tackles for a loss and twenty-five quarterback sacks still rank first, fifth and fourth, respectively, on the Gators' all-time career records lists.

Charlton graduated from the University of Florida with a bachelor's degree in psychology in 1988.

Professional career 

As a first round pick, the Browns had high expectations for Charlton. However, he suffered a severe knee injury that tore the MCL and ACL ligaments of his knee and prematurely ended his professional career.

See also 

 1987 College Football All-America Team
 Florida Gators football, 1980–89
 History of the Cleveland Browns
 List of Cleveland Browns first-round draft picks
 List of Florida Gators football All-Americans
 List of Florida Gators in the NFL Draft
 List of University of Florida alumni

References

Bibliography 

 Carlson, Norm, University of Florida Football Vault: The History of the Florida Gators, Whitman Publishing, LLC, Atlanta, Georgia (2007).  .
 Golenbock, Peter, Go Gators!  An Oral History of Florida's Pursuit of Gridiron Glory, Legends Publishing, LLC, St. Petersburg, Florida (2002).  .
 Hairston, Jack, Tales from the Gator Swamp: A Collection of the Greatest Gator Stories Ever Told, Sports Publishing, LLC, Champaign, Illinois (2002).  .
 McCarthy, Kevin M.,  Fightin' Gators: A History of University of Florida Football, Arcadia Publishing, Mount Pleasant, South Carolina (2000).  .
 Nash, Noel, ed., The Gainesville Sun Presents The Greatest Moments in Florida Gators Football, Sports Publishing, Inc., Champaign, Illinois (1998).  .

1965 births
Living people
All-American college football players
American football linebackers
Cleveland Browns players
Florida Gators football players
Players of American football from Tallahassee, Florida